In inorganic chemistry, an orthoborate is a polyatomic anion with formula  or a salt containing the anion; such as trisodium orthoborate . It is one of several boron oxoanions, or borates.

The name is also used in organic chemistry for the trivalent functional group , or any compound (ester) that contains it, such as triethyl orthoborate .

Structure

The orthoborate ion is known in the solid state, for example, in calcium orthoborate , where it adopts a nearly trigonal planar structure. It is a structural analogue of the carbonate anion , with which it is isoelectronic. Simple bonding theories point to the trigonal planar structure. In terms of valence bond theory, the bonds are formed by using sp2 hybridisations on boron.

Some compounds termed orthoborates do not necessarily contain the trigonal planar ion. For example, gadolinium orthoborate  contains the planar  ion only a high temperatures; otherwise it contains the polyborate anion .

Reactions

Solution in water
When orthoborate salts are dissolved in water, the anion converts mostly to boric acid  and other hydrogen-containing borate anions, mainly tetrahydroxoborate . The reactions of orthoborate in solution are therefore mostly those of these compounds.

In particular, these reactions include the condensation of tetrahydroxoborate with cis-vicinal diols such as mannitol, sorbitol, glucose and glycerol, to form relatively stable anion esters. This reaction is used in analytic chemistry to determine the concentration of borate anions.

See also

 metaborate
 tetraborate

References

Inorganic chemistry